Dashtaki District is in Chaldoran County, West Azerbaijan province, Iran. At the 2006 National Census, its population was 9,069 in 1,885 households. The following census in 2011 counted 8,579 people in 2,312 households. At the latest census in 2016, the district had 7,570 inhabitants in 2,150 households.

References 

Chaldoran County

Districts of West Azerbaijan Province

Populated places in West Azerbaijan Province

Populated places in Chaldoran County